John Evans (25 June 1867 – 5 January 1958) was a Progressive party member of the House of Commons of Canada. He was born in Rhayader, Radnorshire, Wales, the son of John Evans and Mary Wylde, moved to Canada in 1890 and became a farmer.

Evans attended school at Rhayader and Gaufron. He was a public school principal at Teignmouth, England. Evans was also a Life Governor of the British and Foreign Bible Society.

He was first elected to Parliament at the Saskatoon riding in the 1921 general election. After serving one term there, he moved to the Rosetown riding where he was re-elected in 1925 and 1926. After two terms at Rosetown, Evans was defeated by William John Loucks of the Liberals in the 1930 federal election. Evans made another attempt to return to Parliament in the 1935 election, this time under the Co-operative Commonwealth Federation, but was unsuccessful in that campaign at the Saskatoon City riding.

References

External links
 

1867 births
1958 deaths
Farmers from Saskatchewan
Members of the House of Commons of Canada from Saskatchewan
Progressive Party of Canada MPs
Heads of schools in England
Welsh emigrants to Canada
Co-operative Commonwealth Federation candidates for the Canadian House of Commons